The Kyundyulyun ( or Горы Кюндюлюн) is a mountain range in the Sakha Republic, Far Eastern Federal District, Russia. The nearest airport is Ust-Kuyga Airport, located in Ust-Yansky District.

Geography  
It is a smooth-looking range, rising above the right bank of the lower course of the Yana River. The Kyundyulyun forms a northeastern prolongation of the Kular Range, which extends from the southwest on the other side of the Yana, overlapping with the northern foothills of the Chersky Range that extend from the southeast.

To the north and northeast the Kyundyulyun is limited by the Yana-Indigirka Lowland, part of the East Siberian Lowland. To the east and southeast the northern foothills of the Chersky Range extend southwards and to the west and south the winding Yana River forms the limit of the range. River Buor-Yuryakh, the main left tributary of the Chondon, has its sources in the range. 

The Kyundyulyun area is practically uninhabited except for the town of Ust-Kuyga, located at the southwestern edge of the range on the eastern bank of the Yana River.

Flora
Permafrost prevails in the area of the Kyundyulyun owing to the northerly location and the closeness of the Laptev Sea. The range looks quite barren, being mostly covered with tundra. There are forests of larch in the southern slopes and in some of the deeper and more protected valleys.

Climate
The range has a harsh subarctic climate. In summer the average July temperature in the valleys does not exceed .

References

External links
Weather - Ust-Kuyga
Ust-Kuyga - Pictures

Mountain ranges of the Sakha Republic